was the pen name of , a Japanese psychiatrist, novelist and essayist.

Kita was the second son of poet Mokichi Saitō. Shigeta Saitō, his older brother, was also a psychiatrist. The essayist Yuka Saitō is Kita's daughter.

Kita attended Azabu High School and Matsumoto Higher School (now part of Shinshu University), and graduated from Tohoku University's School of Medicine. He initially worked as a doctor at Keio University Hospital. Motivated by the collections of his father's poems and the books of German author Thomas Mann, he decided to become a novelist.

Kita suffered from manic–depressive disorder from middle age onwards.

Awards 
 1960: Akutagawa Prize, for the novel, In The Corner Of Night And Fog, which takes its title from Nacht und Nebel, the Nazi campaign to eliminate Jews, the mentally ill and other minorities. The novel concerns the moral quandary of staff at a German mental hospital during the final years of the Second World War.  Faced with demands from the SS that the most severely ill patients be segregated for transportation to a special camp, where it is obvious that they will be eliminated, the more morally conscious of the doctors make desperate efforts to protect the patients without outwardly defying the authorities. A parallel theme is the personal tragedy of a young Japanese researcher affiliated with the mental hospital, whose own schizophrenia has been triggered by the disappearance of his half-Jewish wife. (Shinchosha Co., Morio Kita - In the Corner of Night and Fog and Other Stories, 2011)

Bibliography 
Incomplete - to be updated

Novels 
 Ghosts (1954) 
  Briefly noted in The New Yorker 60/48 (14 January 1985): p. 117

Essays 
 Papa wa Tanoshii Sōutubyō (work with Yuka Saitō, Asahi Shimbun Company)

Work for television 
 Nescafé Gold Blend commercial (1974)
 Tetsuko no Heya (1980 and 12 May 2008; with Yuka Saitō)

References 

1927 births
2011 deaths
Azabu High School alumni
Japanese children's writers
Japanese essayists
Japanese fantasy writers
20th-century Japanese novelists
21st-century Japanese novelists
Japanese psychiatrists
Japanese travel writers
Academic staff of Keio University
Night and Fog program
People with bipolar disorder
Tohoku University alumni
Akutagawa Prize winners
Writers from Tokyo
20th-century essayists
21st-century essayists
20th-century pseudonymous writers